Anopina wrighti is a species of moth of the family Tortricidae. It is found in Colorado in the United States.

The wingspan is about 14 mm.

References

Moths described in 2000
wrighti
Moths of North America